Broadford railway station is located on the North East line in Victoria, Australia. It serves the town of Broadford, and  opened on 18 April 1872.

History
Broadford station was opened when the North-East line was opened as far as School House Lane. The duplication of the line was carried out north to Tallarook in 1883, and then south to Wandong in 1886.

The first station building was provided in 1878 and, for many years, the station had two goods sheds, one on each side of the line, along with lengthy platforms for timber traffic. They were removed in 1909, and a cool store was erected.

The present station building dates to 1960, when the station was rebuilt to accommodate the new standard gauge line to Albury. For the same reason, the goods shed, crane and livestock race were relocated to the west side of the main line. The majority of goods sidings had been removed by 1988, along with a number of points leading into the sidings. Another siding was removed in 1989.

Broadford Loop opened on the parallel standard gauge line in 1962, along with the line.

In 2014, a trailing crossover at the up end of the station was booked out of use, and was removed at a later date.

In February 2019, the station was abolished as a double line block post, and the signal box, signals and all associated equipment was removed.

Platforms and services
Broadford has two side platforms. It is served by V/Line Seymour and Shepparton line trains.

Platform 1:
 services to Southern Cross
 services to Southern Cross

Platform 2:
 services to Seymour
 services to Shepparton

References

External links

Victorian Railway Stations gallery

Railway stations in Australia opened in 1872
Regional railway stations in Victoria (Australia)
Shire of Mitchell